Tony Allen may refer to:

Music
 Tony Allen (musician) (1940–2020), Nigerian drummer with Fela Kuti and one of the founders of Afrobeat
 Tony Allen, member of doo-wop group The Furys
 Tony Allen, Irish singer, member of duo Foster and Allen with Mick Foster
 Tony Allen, recording alias of J.W. Hodkinson (1942–2013), English rock singer

Others
 Tony Allen (footballer) (1939–2022), English footballer
 Tony Allen (basketball) (born 1982), American former basketball player
 Tony Allen (comedian) (born 1945), English comedian and writer 
 Tony Allen (academic administrator), president of the Delaware State University

See also
 Tony Allan (disambiguation)
 Anthony Allen (disambiguation)